Yinmaxia railway station  is a station on the Chinese Qinghai–Tibet Railway. It is located in Haixi Mongol and Tibetan Autonomous Prefecture, in the eastern part of the Qaidam Basin.

Passenger service at Yinmaxia is very limited; as of the later 2013, just one train a day stops there.

Yinmaxia is the junction point where the future Golmud–Dunhuang Railway will join the Qinghai–Tibet Railway.

See also

 Qinghai–Tibet Railway
 List of stations on Qinghai–Tibet railway

Notes

Railway stations in Qinghai
Stations on the Qinghai–Tibet Railway
Haixi Mongol and Tibetan Autonomous Prefecture